Stephen 'Steve' P Butler, (born 1963) is a retired male badminton player and current coach from England.

Badminton career
Butler represented England and won a gold medal in the team event, at the 1990 Commonwealth Games in Auckland, New Zealand. He also participated in the singles and reached the quarter finals where he lost to the eventual winner Rashid Sidek.

He won 74 caps for England between 1982 and 1994. While playing and coaching in the United States in the mid 1990s Butler won men's singles at the U.S. (closed) National Championships in 1996, five years after having won singles at the Open U.S. Championships in 1991.

Achievements

IBF World Grand Prix 
The World Badminton Grand Prix sanctioned by International Badminton Federation (IBF) from 1983 to 2006.

Men's singles

Coaching
Leaving England in the mid 1990s he coached initially in New York and then in Colorado where he became the United States National coach. In 1997 he became the England national coach for the junior team and then in 2002 became the National men’s singles coach until 2005. He returned to the same role in 2015.

References

English male badminton players
Living people
1963 births
Commonwealth Games medallists in badminton
Commonwealth Games gold medallists for England
Badminton players at the 1990 Commonwealth Games
Medallists at the 1990 Commonwealth Games